The Nashville Metros were an American soccer team based in Nashville, Tennessee, United States. Founded in 1989, the team most recently played in the Premier Development League (PDL), the fourth tier of the American Soccer Pyramid, in the South Atlantic Division of the Eastern Conference. The Metros were the longest continuously operating soccer club in the United Soccer Leagues before their last season in 2012.

In the side's later years its home games were contested at Ezell Park and E. S. Rose Park.

History
The Nashville Metros were founded by Lynn Agee and Devinder Sandhu and began indoor play in the Sunbelt Independent Soccer League in 1990. Due to a lack of facilities, the team played their entire first season on the road, before settling in Smyrna. The Metros continued to play indoors until 1996, but only won six matches in six seasons. During much of the same period, the outdoor team played in the USL's amateur Premier League with significantly better results. Nashville's first winning season came in 1995 with a 12–6 record and their first playoff appearance. The 1996 team witnessed the Metros' Pasi Kinturi score a league-leading 19 goals as he was named that season's league MVP.

The Metros moved up to the second division A-League in 1997. After several years of playing at various high school and municipal stadiums in Nashville and Franklin, the team settled into their new home at Ezell Park. Nashville made their first U.S. Open Cup appearance in the 1998 tournament where they routed the third division Delaware Wizards before advancing to face the Kansas City Wizards of Major League Soccer. A heavy underdog, the Metros pulled off the upset of the tournament with a victory over the first division club in front of an ecstatic home crowd. Nashville eventually fell in the quarterfinals to MLS' Dallas Burn.

In 1999 due to financial circumstances, the club was forced to reorganize. The side was renamed the Tennessee Rhythm and moved from Nashville to Franklin, but returned to their original venue in 2001, reverting to their original name at the same time. This time period featured an unsuccessful rematch against the Dallas Burn in the 2000 U.S. Open Cup and a nationally televised game against the Los Angeles Galaxy in the 2001 tournament. In 2002 the Metros moved down from the A-League to the Premier Development League, mainly due to Ezell Park's substandard facilities, such as the lack of a press box.

Beginning with their first playoff appearance in 1994, Nashville made eight postseason trips over the next 11 years.

Players

Final roster
Source

Notable former players

This list of notable former players comprises players who went on to play professional soccer after playing for the team, or those who previously played professionally before joining the team.

  Jay Ayres
  Kainoa Bailey
  Kalin Bankov
  Trevor Banks
  Ian Borders
  Jon Busch
  Danny DeVall
  Tanner Redden
  Gabe Eastman
  Albert Edward
  John Jones
  Pasi Kinturi
  Patrick Parker
  Steve Klein
  Tony Kuhn
  Jamel Mitchell
  Richard Mulrooney
  Dimitry Shamootin
  J. P. Rodrigues
  Daryl Sattler

Year-by-year

Indoor

Honors
USISL A-League
 Central Conference Champions (1): 1998

Head coaches
  Greg Petersen (1998–1999)
  Brett Mosen (2000–2001)
  Andy Poklad (2002–2004)
  Rico Laise (1999, 2007–2008)
  Richard Askey (2009)
  Obed Compean (2005–2006, 2010)
  Ricardo Lopez (2011)
  Brent Goulet (2012)

Stadium
 Stadiums in Nashville and Franklin, Tennessee; (1990–1996)
 Stadium in Franklin, Tennessee; (1999–2000)
 Ezell Park; Nashville, Tennessee (1997–1998, 2001–2011)
 Siegel Park; Murfreesboro, Tennessee 5 games (2007–2010)
 E.S. Rose Park; Nashville, Tennessee; (2012)

Average attendance
Attendance stats are calculated by averaging each team's self-reported home attendances from the historical match archive at https://web.archive.org/web/20131208011525/http://www.uslsoccer.com/history/index_E.html.

 2005: 307
 2006: 392 (8th in PDL)
 2007: 361
 2008: 308
 2009: 162
 2010: 215
 2011: 349

References

External links
Official PDL site

Defunct soccer clubs in Tennessee
Association football clubs established in 1989
Association football clubs disestablished in 2012
Sports in Nashville, Tennessee
USL League Two teams
A-League (1995–2004) teams
USISL teams
Defunct indoor soccer clubs in the United States
1989 establishments in Tennessee
2012 disestablishments in Tennessee